The Glover House is a historic house located at 249 East Squantum Street in Quincy, Massachusetts.

Description and history 
The -story timber-framed house was built in 1798, and is one of Quincy's few well-preserved Federal style houses. An addition was added to the rear in the late 19th century, and a Greek Revival style porch and door surround were added (the latter replacing an earlier Federal surround). The land the house was built on was in the Glover family for 280 years.

The house was listed on the National Register of Historic Places on September 20, 1989.

See also
National Register of Historic Places listings in Quincy, Massachusetts

References

Federal architecture in Massachusetts
Houses completed in 1798
Houses in Quincy, Massachusetts
National Register of Historic Places in Quincy, Massachusetts
Houses on the National Register of Historic Places in Norfolk County, Massachusetts